Tsarevo Municipality is a municipality in Burgas Province, Bulgaria.

Demographics

Religion 
According to the latest Bulgarian census of 2011, the religious composition, among those who answered the optional question on religious identification, was the following:

Subdivision

In the municipality enter 13 localities:

References

External links

  

Municipalities in Burgas Province